The windowpane flounder (Scophthalmus aquosus) is a species of fish in the family Scophthalmidae. It is widespread at a depth of 5–73 meters in the western Atlantic from the Gulf of St. Lawrence in Canada to Florida in the United States. An important commercial species, they can grow up to 45.7 cm in length, and live up to 7 years.

References
 Scophthalmus aquosus at FishBase

windowpane flounder
Commercial fish
Fish of the Western Atlantic
Fauna of Atlantic Canada
Fish of the Eastern United States
windowpane flounder
Taxa named by Samuel L. Mitchill